Cochylimorpha meridiana is a species of moth of the family Tortricidae. It is found in France, Spain, Portugal, Switzerland, Italy, Albania, North Macedonia, Greece, Bulgaria, Romania, Ukraine, Russia (Sarepta, Ural, the Caucasus) and Asia Minor.

The wingspan is 19–25 mm. Adults have been recorded on wing from April to September.

References

Moths described in 1859
Cochylimorpha
Moths of Asia
Moths of Europe